The 2022 Birmingham City Council election took place on 5 May 2022, with all 101 council seats up for election across 37 single-member and 32 two-member wards. The election was held alongside other local elections across Great Britain and town council elections in Sutton Coldfield.

In the previous council election in 2018, the first all-out elections in Birmingham, Labour maintained its control of the council, winning 67 seats. The Conservatives formed the main opposition with twenty-five seats, with the Liberal Democrats on eight and the Green Party winning a single seat. In 2022, Labour maintained overall control. The Liberal Democrats and the Greens gained seats at the expense of Labour and the Conservatives.

Background 

The Local Government Act 1972 created a two-tier system of metropolitan counties and districts covering Greater Manchester, Merseyside, South Yorkshire, Tyne and Wear, the West Midlands, and West Yorkshire starting in 1974. Birmingham was a district of the West Midlands metropolitan county. The Local Government Act 1985 abolished the metropolitan counties, with metropolitan districts taking on most of their powers as metropolitan boroughs. The West Midlands Combined Authority was created in 2016 and began electing the mayor of the West Midlands from 2017, which was given strategic powers covering a region coterminous with the former West Midlands metropolitan county.

Since its formation Birmingham City Council has variously been under Labour control, Conservative control and no overall control. Councillors have predominantly been elected from the Labour Party, Conservative Party and the Liberal Democrats. The council has had an overall Labour majority since the 2012 council election, when they regained control from the Conservative-Liberal Democrat coalition that had run the city since 2004. In the most recent council election in 2018, Labour won 67 seats with 50.2% of the vote, the Conservatives won 25 seats with 28.8% of the vote, the Liberal Democrats won 8 seats with 14.1% of the vote and the Green Party won a single seat with 4.4% of the vote.

The Labour councillor for Oscott Keith Linnecor died in February 2020, having served on the council for 25 years. Labour councillors for Billesley and Hall Green North, Lucy Seymour-Smith and Lou Robson, resigned. The former Labour council leader John Clancy also resigned his council seat in Quinton. Due to the COVID-19 pandemic, all four by-elections were held in May 2021 alongside the local elections across the country including the West Midlands mayoral election. The Labour candidates Katherine Carlisle and Saima Suleman were elected in Billesley and Hall Green North; while the Conservative candidates Darius Sandhu and Dominic Stanford made gains for their party in Oscott and Quinton. A Liberal Democrat councillor for Yardley East, Neil Eustace, died in September 2021. He had served on the council for 35 years. The Liberal Democrat candidate Deborah Harries successfully defended his seat in the October 2021 by-election. The Labour MP for Birmingham Erdington Jack Dromey died in January 2022. The Labour candidate Paulette Hamilton won the by-election held to fill the seat in March, with an increased share of the vote. The Labour councillor Zhor Malik defected to the Conservative Party in February 2022.

Campaign 
The Labour Party pledged to "treble" the number of speed cameras in the city if they were re-elected.
The Liberal Democrats pledge to quadruple speed cameras, propose funding for up to 400 "walking bus conductors" and look to devolve the powers and resources of the council to more localised groups.

Council composition

Prior to the election

Birmingham City council has been controlled by the Labour Party since 2012. The Conservative Party last held sole control of the council in 1984. It was under no overall control from 2003 until 2012, run by a Labour-Liberal Democrat coalition from 2003 to 2004 and by a Conservative-Liberal Democrat coalition from 2004 to 2012.

Changes:
February 2020: Keith Linnecor (Labour, Oscott) dies; by election held in May 2021, John Clancy (Labour, Quinton) resigns; by-election held in May 2021
 December 2020: Lou Robson (Labour, Hall Green North) resigns; by-election held in May 2021
 March 2021: Lucy Seymour-Smith (Labour, Billesley) resigns; by-election held in May 2021
 May 2021: Labour win by-elections in Billesley and Hall Green North, and Conservatives gain Oscott and Quinton in by-elections
 September 2021: Neil Eustace (Liberal Democrat, Yardley East) dies; by-election held in October 2021
 October 2021: Liberal Democrats win Yardley East by-election
 November 2021: Penny Holbrook (Labour, Stockland Green) dies; seat left vacant until 2022 election
 February 2022: Zhor Malik (Balsall Heath West) joins Conservatives from Labour
 March 2022: Mohammed Fazal (Labour, Sparkhill) dies; seat left vacant until 2022 election

Summary

Election result

|}

Ward results 
Birmingham City Council began publishing ward results on 6 May 2022.

Wards beginning A-G

Acocks Green

Allens Cross

Alum Rock

Aston

Balsall Heath West

Bartley Green

Billesley

Birchfield

Bordesley and Highgate

Bordesley Green

Bournbrook and Selly Park

Bournville and Cotteridge

Brandwood and Kings Heath

Bromford and Hodge Hill

Castle Vale

Druids Heath and Monyhull

Edgbaston

Erdington

Frankley Great Park

Garretts Green

Glebe Farm and Tile Cross

Gravelly Hill

Wards beginning H-R

Hall Green North

Hall Green South

Handsworth

Handsworth Wood

Harborne

Heartlands

Highters Heath

Holyhead

Kings Norton North

Kings Norton South

Kingstanding

Ladywood

Longbridge and West Heath

Lozells

Moseley

Nechells

Newtown

Northfield

North Edgbaston

Oscott

Perry Barr

Perry Common

Pype Hayes

Quinton

Rubery and Rednal

Wards beginning S-Y

Shard End

Sheldon

Small Heath

Soho and Jewellery Quarter

South Yardley

Sparkbrook and Balsall Heath East

Sparkhill

Stirchley

Stockland Green

Sutton Four Oaks

Sutton Mere Green

Sutton Reddicap

Sutton Roughley

Sutton Trinity

Sutton Vesey

Sutton Walmley and Minworth

Sutton Wylde Green

Tyseley and Hay Mills

Ward End

Weoley & Selly Oak

Yardley East

Yardley West and Stechford

By-elections

Sparkbrook and Balsall Heath East

References

Birmingham
Birmingham City Council elections
2020s in Birmingham, West Midlands